Design Triangle is a transport design firm, based in Cambridge, UK.  Founded in 1986, Design Triangle specializes in the design of the interiors and exteriors of vehicles (and vessels) for public transport, particularly rail passenger cars.

Rail Vehicles 

Design Triangle is best known for the concept design of the interior and exterior of the Heathrow Express Class 332 trains and the exterior design of the MTR Hong Kong Airport Express. Other published work includes the design of the larnrod Eireann Inter-City Mark 4 trains and the interior concept design for the Class 378 rail cars for London Overground.  Design Triangle also recently redesigned the Swiss Railways’ range of vehicle interiors.

According to Jane's World Railways, other projects include interior and exterior concept designs for Rotterdam Metro, STIB Brussels Tramway 2000, Connex Melbourne X'Trapolis 100 trains, Spoornet 9E loco driver's cab refurbishment, design of the exterior and driver's cab for Hong Kong's MTR Airport Express train, passenger flow studies for DLR Docklands Light Railway, interior design for BAE Systems on Kawasaki's MARC III Bi-Level coaches, interior design concepts for Madrid Metro and rail seat prototypes for KAB Seating.

Marine 

Design Triangle has created industrial design concepts for the exteriors and interiors of fast ferries and water taxis for Damen Shipyards, including the Dubai Water Taxi and the Damen DFF 3207 low wash catamaran for Dubai.

Services 

Design Triangle designs the form, aesthetics and layout of vehicles, including interiors, exteriors and driver’s cabs, from industrial design concepts to 3D CAD models and manufacturing drawings.  Services are provided to railway companies, rail vehicle manufacturers and component manufacturers.

Award 

At the Design Business Association's Design Effectiveness Awards in 2000, Design Triangle won the Grand Prix and Design Management awards for the design of the Class 332 trains, as a collaborative team with BAA Heathrow Express, Wolff Olins and Glazer.

References

External links 
 Design Triangle - rail vehicles

Design companies of the United Kingdom
Industrial design firms
Vehicle design
Companies established in 1986
1986 establishments in the United Kingdom